Emery Farm may refer to:

 Emery Farm (Durham, New Hampshire), a continually owned family farm since 1655
 Emery Farm (Stratham, New Hampshire), on the National Register of Historic Places

See also
 Emery Farmstead, Port Angeles, Washington, on the National Register of Historic Places